is a Japanese model and actress.

History
Born in Kodaira, Tokyo, Enomoto won teen-oriented magazine Nicola's "reader model" audition in 1999, which led to an exclusive contract with the magazine and jump-started her career as an idol.

Enomoto has also appeared in glamour photo shoots, movies, and several TV advertisements.

Filmography
My Neighbor Monchan (2003)
Secret of the First Time (2004)
Animus Anima (2005)

See also
nicola (magazine)
Gakky

References

Japanese female models
1985 births
Living people
People from Kodaira, Tokyo
Actresses from Tokyo